The E. G. West Centre is an institution at Newcastle University which advocates choice, competition and entrepreneurship in education. They perform research into private schooling in some of the world's poorest economies. It is currently directed by James Tooley. Other notable people at the centre include Pauline Dixon and Sugata Mitra.

See also
 James Tooley
 Pauline Dixon
 Sugata Mitra
 E. G. West

External links
 
 Spinprofiles E. G. West Centre

Newcastle University